The 2022 IIHF World Championship Division I was an international ice hockey tournament run by the International Ice Hockey Federation.

The Group A tournament was held in Ljubljana, Slovenia from 3 to 8 May and the Group B tournament in Tychy, Poland from 26 April to 1 May 2022.

After the tournament was cancelled the two previous years due to the COVID-19 pandemic, all teams were set to remain in their groups for the 2022 edition. However, France and Austria, who were relegated to Division IA in 2019, were called back up to the top division to replace Russia and Belarus, who were suspended by the IIHF during the 2022 Russian invasion of Ukraine. Lithuania, who were relegated to Division IB in 2019, were called back up to Division IA so that there would be an equal number of teams in each group.

Slovenia got promoted to the top division by winning the Group A tournament alongside Hungary. Poland won the Group B tournament and got promoted. Following the tournament, the IIHF decided not to relegate Romania or Serbia, who finished last in groups A and B respectively, in order for the division to fill up to its normal amount of twelve teams (six in each group).

Group A tournament

Participants

Standings

Results
All times are local (UTC+2)

Statistics

Scoring leaders
List shows the top skaters sorted by points, then goals.

GP = Games played; G = Goals; A = Assists; Pts = Points; +/− = Plus/Minus; PIM = Penalties in Minutes; POS = Position
Source: IIHF.com

Goaltending leaders
Only the top five goaltenders, based on save percentage, who have played at least 40% of their team's minutes, are included in this list.

TOI = time on ice (minutes:seconds); SA = shots against; GA = goals against; GAA = goals against average; Sv% = save percentage; SO = shutouts
Source: IIHF.com

Awards
Media All-stars

Best Players Selected by the Directorate

Group B tournament

Participants

Match officials
Six referees and six linesmen were selected for the tournament.

Standings

Results
All times are local (UTC+2)

Statistics

Scoring leaders
List shows the top skaters sorted by points, then goals.

GP = Games played; G = Goals; A = Assists; Pts = Points; +/− = Plus/Minus; PIM = Penalties in Minutes; POS = Position
Source: IIHF.com

Goaltending leaders
Only the top five goaltenders, based on save percentage, who have played at least 40% of their team's minutes, are included in this list.

TOI = time on ice (minutes:seconds); SA = shots against; GA = goals against; GAA = goals against average; Sv% = save percentage; SO = shutouts
Source: IIHF.com

Awards

References

External links
 Official website of Division IA
 Official website of Division IB

2022
Division I
2022 IIHF World Championship Division I
2022 IIHF World Championship Division I
Sports competitions in Ljubljana
Sports competitions in Katowice
2022 in Slovenian sport
2022 in Polish sport
IIHF
May 2022 sports events in Slovenia